India–Luxembourg relations are the foreign relations between India and Luxembourg. Luxembourg has an embassy in New Delhi, whilst the Indian Embassy in Brussels is accredited to Luxembourg.

History

India–Luxembourg relations started in 1947, in recent years relations between the two nations have grown. Luxembourg opened its embassy in New Delhi in 2002. More than 170 Indian Companies are listed on the Luxembourg Stock Exchange. Bilateral trade the two nations stood at $37.17 million from January–September 2014, with exports from India to Luxembourg at $7.79 million and imported goods to India from
Luxembourg at $29.38 million. There is a significant community of Indians living in Luxembourg working in companies or fields such as Arcelor-Mittal, IT and Banking. There have been several major diplomatic visits by both countries to the other. Grand Duke Jean became the first Luxembourg Head of State to visit India in 1983 and since several trade and foreign affair ministers from Luxembourg have visited the country. In 2015, Foreign Minister Jean Asselborn visited the country. In 2012, India's Minister of External Affairs visited Luxembourg.

In 2019, Luxembourg plans to be the first European nation to host the annual Asian Infrastructure Investment Bank meeting. The nation is also planning an economic mission to India in the same year.

In 2023, Luxembourg Post issued a miniature sheet with a  pair of postage stamps commemorating the 75 years of friendship between India and Luxembourg.  The stamps honour Amar Nath Sehgal, a sculptor, painter and poet.

External links
Embassy of Luxembourg in New Delhi

See also
List of ambassadors of Luxembourg to India

References

 
Luxembourge
Bilateral relations of Luxembourg